The MEGAL pipeline is a major natural gas pipeline system in southern Germany. It transports natural gas from the Czech–German and Austrian–German borders to the German–French border.

History
Construction started in 1975 when Ruhrgas and Gaz de France formed a partnership (Mittel-Europäische-Gasleitungsgesellschaft) for transportation of Russian natural gas to France and southern Germany. The pipeline was commissioned in 1980.  The pipeline cost €634 million.

In July 2009, the European Commission fined GDF Suez, now Engie and E.ON €553 million each due to collusion on the MEGAL pipeline. Commission officials claimed there was a deal between the two groups’ predecessor companies – Gaz de France and Ruhrgas – not to sell gas sent via MEGAL into each other's home markets dating from the mid-1970s. The Commission alleged that the companies maintained these arrangements after European gas markets were liberalised despite knowing that the 1975 deal violated competition rules.  They are the second largest fines imposed by the European Commission and the first on the energy sector.  The decision is contested by both companies, who argue that the business rules in 1975 differed from those of today.  In 1975, Ruhrgas and Gaz de France concluded arrangements according to which they agreed not to sell gas in each other's home market. The deal was abandoned in 2005.

Technical description
It comprises two interconnected pipelines—MEGAL Nord and MEGAL Süd. It is operated at a pressure of 80 bar (1,160 psi), which is secured by three compressor stations. The capacity of the pipeline is 22 billion cubic metres (777 billion cubic feet) of natural gas per year, or a little more than 60 million cubic metres (2 billion cubic feet) per day.

The -long MEGAL Süd pipeline between Oberkappel and Schwandorf is operated at a pressure of 67.5 bar (979 psi), which is secured by two compressor stations.

The MEGAL pipeline crosses the Trans Europa Naturgas Pipeline and the Remich pipeline at Mittelbrunn, the METG (pipeline from the German-Dutch border) at Gernsheim, and the pipeline going to the Ruhr Industrial Area at Rimpar.

Ownership
The pipeline is owned by Open Grid Europe (51%) and GRTgaz Deutschland (subsidiary of GRTgaz – 49%). It is operated by Open Grid Europe.

References

External links 

 GRTgaz Deutschland GmbH
 Map of pipeline

Energy infrastructure completed in 1980
Natural gas pipelines in Germany
Engie